Standish is a town in the Metropolitan Borough of Wigan, Greater Manchester, England.  It contains 22 listed buildings that are recorded in the National Heritage List for England.  Of these, one is listed at Grade I, the highest of the three grades, two are at Grade II*, the middle grade, and the others are at Grade II, the lowest grade.  The town and the surrounding countryside contain a variety of listed buildings, including three medieval cross bases, a village cross and stocks, houses, a church and associated structures, farmhouses, three mileposts, a drinking fountain, and two war memorials.


Key

Buildings

References

Citations

Sources

Lists of listed buildings in Greater Manchester
Standish, Greater Manchester